Indaragi (also spelled as Indargi) is a village in the Koppal taluk of Koppal district in the Indian state of Karnataka.
Indaragi is 15 km from Koppal.

Demographics
As of 2001 India census, Indaragi had a population of 4,738 with 2,422 males and 2,316 females and 734 Households.

See also
 Hospet
 Munirabad
 Gangavathi
 Koppal
 Karnataka

References

Villages in Koppal district